The Middelburg Bastion was one of nine bastions of the Fortress of Malacca, in  Melaka City, Melaka, Malaysia located at the mouth of Melaka River. The bastion has been restored, together with cannons, and is open for visitors. The Dutch name is in reference to the city of Middelburg, Zeeland.

History
After the fall of Portuguese Malacca to the Dutch in 1641, the Dutch carried out new measures to ensure the defence and security of Malacca due to the ongoing threats they received from outside and inside. They fortified the wall of Malacca City to further strengthen the existing city defence left by the Portuguese. The fortification measures involved the construction of a bastion strategically located at the mouth of Malacca River. The construction of the Middelburg Bastion was carried out in 1660.

See also
 List of tourist attractions in Melaka

References

1660 establishments in the Dutch Empire
Buildings and structures in Malacca City
Buildings and structures completed in 1660
Forts in Malaysia